Bagnone is a comune (municipality) in the Province of Massa and Carrara in the Italian region Tuscany, located about  northwest of Florence and about  northwest of Massa in the Lunigiana, facing the Monte Sillara, which has a peak elevation of . The communal territory is crossed by the Bagnone torrent, a left affluence of the Magra River.

Sights include the castle, the churches of San Niccolò (rebuilt in the 18th century, including a 15th-century Madonna del Pianto from the medieval edifice) and San Leonardo (1785) and the oratory of San Terenzio (housing 17th-century paintings).

On 22 August 2009, a lottery player from Bagnone won an estimated €146.9 million (£128 million / US$211 million) in Italy's SuperEnalotto. This is thought to have then been Europe's biggest ever lottery win.

Main sights

The church of the Madonna del Pianto
The church of Madonna del Pianto has a rectangular shape with a unique nave with neoclassical columns and two semi-octagons on the lateral sides.
The sacred complex has a central dome, a balustrade with a chess paving decorated with polychrom marbles which opens to a major altar and a wide choir. The True Cross relic is venerated on 5 May and on 14 September each year.

Near the apse there is a pipe organ with three spans and a pediment shaped as a tympanum. The pipe organ was built in 1899 by Gaetano Cavalli of Lodi.

Notes

Cities and towns in Tuscany
Castles in Italy
Freemasonry in Italy